Finedon railway station was built by the Midland Railway in 1857 on its extension from Leicester to Bedford and Hitchin.

It had one island platform. Being a mile and a half from Finedon village it was little used in later years and closed to passengers in 1940. It remained open for goods until 1964 and had quite large sidings for the local stone, with a tramway to the Excelsior and the Finedon Hill mines.

Stationmasters

Joseph Wright until 1861 (afterwards station master at Sharnbrook)
G. Salmon from 1861
W. Wood until 1873 (afterwards station master at Barton and Walton))
W. Doughty 1873 - 1876 (formerly station master at Grafham, afterwards station master at Helpston)
J. Blower 1876 - 1878 (afterwards station master at Chapel-en-le-Frith)
Edwin Hoe 1878 - 1885  (formerly station master at Whatstandwell, afterwards station master at Sharnbrook)
G.E. Cookson 1885 - 1891 (afterwards station master at Wilnecote)
Henry Pitt 1891 - 1893 (afterwards station master at Rushden)
W.S. Orchard 1893 - 1896 
A. Roper 1896 - 1910 (formerly station master at Higham Ferrers, afterwards station master at Wellingborough)
Mr. Goatman 1910
Mark Avery 1910 - 1921 (afterwards station master at Stanton Gate)
Albert Edgar Brinklow ca. 1925
Joseph Higgs ca. 1942
H.L. Stanton from 1944
Edward A. Steele ca. 1950

References

 
 

Disused railway stations in Northamptonshire
Former Midland Railway stations
Railway stations in Great Britain opened in 1857
Railway stations in Great Britain closed in 1940
Charles Henry Driver railway stations
1857 establishments in England
North Northamptonshire